Justices of the Supreme Court of Canada have the option of releasing reasons for a unanimous decision anonymously by simply attributing the judgment to "The Court". The practice began around 1979 by Chief Justice Laskin, borrowing from the US Supreme Court practice of anonymizing certain unanimous decisions. Unlike in the US, which uses it primarily for uncontroversial cases, in Canada, it is used almost always for important and controversial cases.

It has been suggested that the practice has been used to give greater authority to the decision by having the entire Court speak as a single voice.

Peter McCormick, a professor of political science at the University of Lethbridge who studies Canada's appellate courts, calls these 'per coram decision," but his terminology is not in general use. McCormick states that there were 9 reported per coram decisions prior to Bora Laskin's term as Chief Justice, 15 reported per coram decisions under Laskin's Chief Justiceship, and 51 reported per coram decisions under Dickson's Chief Justiceship.

List
The following is a list of anonymous decisions that are attributed  to "The Court":

See also
Per curiam decision

References

Works published anonymously
Supreme Court of Canada
Canadian case law
Legal history of Canada
Supreme court case law by country